The Perak Coronation Cup is a Malaysian Thoroughbred horse race run annually since 1985 at the Perak Turf Club racecourse in Ipoh, Perak. Held during the third week of November, the 1600 meter (1 mile or 8 furlongs) race on turf is open to horses age three and older. Due to repairs to the racecourse, the 1997 race had to be run at  a distance of 1800 meters.

The Coronation Cup was inaugurated in 1985 to commemorate the installation of Azlan Shah as the Sultan of Perak.

Milestones

W. K. Seow won the Coronation Cup as a jockey in 1987 then ten years later as a trainer.

In 2000, Catherine Treymane became the first female jockey to win the race.

Records
Speed  record:
 1:34.7 - King's Seal (1993)

Most wins:
 2 - Confluence (2002, 2003)
 2 - Golden Ace † (2005, 2006)

Most wins by an owner:
 3 - Confidence Stable (1996, 2002, 2003)

Most wins by a jockey:
 3 - Azhar Ismail (1990, 1991, 1998)
 3 - Saimee Jumaat (1999, 2002, 2007)

Most wins by a trainer:
 3 - Francis Nathan (1996, 2002, 2003)

Winners

 † Bred in Australia, Golden Ace was originally named Foreign Footsteps.

References
 The Coronation Cup at Turfonline.com

Horse racing in Malaysia
Open mile category horse races
Recurring events established in 1985
1985 establishments in Malaysia